Berdyaev or Berdyayev is a Slavic masculine surname, its feminine counterpart is Berdyaeva or Berdyayeva. It may refer to:
 Lydia Berdyaev (1871–1945), Russian poet, wife of Nikolai
 Nikolai Berdyaev (1874–1948), Russian religious and political philosopher
 Minor planet 4184 Berdyayev named after Nikolai Berdyaev